Crimea medal may refer to:

 Crimea Medal (1854), a British campaign medal
 Turkish Crimea Medal (1856), an Ottoman campaign medal
 Medal for the Return of Crimea (2014), a Russian campaign medal

See also

 Crimea (disambiguation)
 Medal (disambiguation)